is a Japanese football player. He plays for Kawasaki Frontale and the Japan national team.

Club career
Miki Yamane joined J1 League club Shonan Bellmare in 2016. On 20 April, he debuted in J.League Cup (v Júbilo Iwata).

International career
He made his debut for Japan national football team on 25 March 2021 in a friendly against South Korea. He scored the opening goal in the 16th minute as Japan won 3–0.

Career statistics

Club

International

Scores and results list Japan's goal tally first.

Honours
Kawasaki Frontale
J1 League: 2020, 2021
Emperor's Cup: 2020
Japanese Super Cup: 2021
Individual
J.League Best XI: 2020, 2021, 2022

References

External links
Profile at Shonan Bellmare

1993 births
Living people
Toin University of Yokohama alumni
Association football people from Kanagawa Prefecture
Japanese footballers
Japan international footballers
J1 League players
J2 League players
Shonan Bellmare players
Kawasaki Frontale players
Association football midfielders
2022 FIFA World Cup players